The 1994–95 Quebec Nordiques season was the 23rd season of operation of the Nordiques and the last season that the team played in Quebec. The Nordiques finished first in the Eastern Conference, but lost in the first round to the New York Rangers. After the season, the club was sold and relocated to Denver, Colorado.

Regular season
The Nordiques exploded out of the gate, winning five-straight games and 12 of their first 13. Although they were terrible on the road, going just 11–12–1, the Nordiques had the best home record in the league: 19–1–4. Quebec's only defeat at home came on February 27 in a 7–5 loss to the Pittsburgh Penguins. Captain Joe Sakic finished fourth in the league in points (62), Owen Nolan tied for third in the league in goals (30) and finished first in the league in game-winning goals (8), while Peter Forsberg led all rookies in points (50). Forsberg went on to win the Calder Memorial Trophy as the NHL's top rookie of the 1994–95 season. The team finished first in scoring in the league with 185 goals and was one of only two Eastern Conference teams to score at least one goal in all of their 48 regular-season games (the Buffalo Sabres were the other team). Quebec went on to finish first in the Eastern Conference with 65 points. The Nordiques tied the Flyers for most hat-tricks scored during the regular season, with six. Owen Nolan had three, while Wendel Clark, Uwe Krupp and Scott Young each had one.

Season standings

Schedule and results

Playoffs
The Nordiques faced the New York Rangers in the first round of the 1995 NHL playoffs. On paper, the Nordiques were the clear favorite, since they had a much better record and had won the season series against the Rangers. However, New York's players had more playoff experience, since most of them had been members of the 1994 Stanley Cup champion team. This fact, combined with the Nordiques players' playoff inexperience and inability to maintain their effective power play, proved to be the ultimate factors in the series, as New York defeated Quebec 4 games to 2. Although each team had allowed only 134 goals during the regular season (tied for 9th in the league), it was an offensive series, as 44 goals were scored (25 by New York, 19 by Quebec) over the 6 games.

Relocation to Denver, Colorado

In the 1994–95 shortened season of 48 games, the Nordiques played well and finished with the best record in the Eastern Conference. The team faltered in the postseason and was eliminated in the first round by the defending Stanley Cup champion New York Rangers.

The playoff loss proved to be Quebec's swan song in the NHL as the team's financial troubles increasingly took center stage, even in the face of renewed fan support over the previous three years.  Quebec City was by far the smallest market in the NHL, and the second-smallest market in North America to host a big-league team (behind only Green Bay, Wisconsin). The league's Canadian teams (with the exception of Montreal, Toronto, and to a lesser extent, Vancouver) found it difficult to compete in a new age of rising player salaries.  This made many of the players concerned about their marketability, especially since the Nords always played in the long shadow of the Canadiens.  In addition, most players were skittish about playing in what was virtually a unilingual Francophone city.  Then as now, there were no privately owned English-language radio stations in the city, and only one privately owned English-language television station.  The only English-language newspaper is a weekly.  Unlike in Montreal, public address announcements were given only in French.

Aubut unsuccessfully petitioned for a bailout from Quebec's provincial government. In May 1995, shortly after the Nordiques were eliminated from the playoffs, Aubut was forced to sell the team to a group of investors in Denver, Colorado. The franchise was moved to Denver where it was renamed the Colorado Avalanche. The Avalanche won the Stanley Cup in their first season after the move, and added another in 2001, and a third in 2022.

The Nordiques had planned to change their logo, colours, and uniforms for the 1995–96 season, and the new design had already appeared in the Canadian press.

Player statistics

Awards and records
 Peter Forsberg, Calder Memorial Trophy
 Peter Forsberg, NHL All-Rookie Team

Transactions
The Nordiques were involved in the following transactions during the 1994-95 season.

Trades

Free agents

Draft picks

References
 Nordiques on Hockey Database

Quebec Nordiques season, 1994-95
Quebec Nordiques seasons
Que